Peter Speck House is a historic home located near Martinsburg, Berkeley County, West Virginia. It was built between 1814 and 1815, and consists of a two-story, two-bay, log section with a gable roof (c. 1814) attached to a two-story, two-bay, gable-roofed stone section (c. 1815). The building dates to the Federal period.  It features a one-story, hip-roof front porch added in the early 1900s.  Also on the property is a fieldstone spring house (c. 1815).

It was listed on the National Register of Historic Places in 2002.

References

Houses on the National Register of Historic Places in West Virginia
Federal architecture in West Virginia
Houses completed in 1814
Houses in Berkeley County, West Virginia
National Register of Historic Places in Berkeley County, West Virginia